Avedøre Holme Offshore Wind Farm is a nearshore wind farm right off the coast of Avedøre, Copenhagen. It was commissioned in 2009 with three 3.6 MW Siemens turbines as a demonstrator project for future offshore wind turbines. Ørsted owns two turbines, and a private collective owns the third. Ørsted and partners build a 2MW hydrogen electrolysis station at Avedøre Power Station supplied by Ørsted's two turbines.

See also

Wind power in Denmark
List of offshore wind farms in Denmark
Avedøre Power Station

References 

Wind farms in Denmark
Ørsted (company) wind farms
Energy infrastructure completed in 2009
2009 establishments in Denmark